Boué Soeurs was a French fashion house active from 1899 to 1957. It was founded by sisters Madame Sylvie Montegut and Baronne Jeanne d'Etreillis under their maiden name, Boué.

History
Sylvie and Jeanne Boué took an interest in design at a very early age.  In a 1922 article in Arts & Decoration magazine, Jeanne wrote:

In 1899 they opened their first shop on the Rue de la Paix in Paris where they sold women's apparel such as evening dresses, gowns, wedding dresses, frocks, lingerie, and camisoles. Baronne d'Etreillis opened a second shop in New York City in 1915.

Style
Boué Soeurs was known for creating elaborate ensembles with very feminine designs. Signature elements included fine Alençon and Duchesse lace, embroidery, ribbon work, and gold and silver textiles. While some of their evening dresses retailed for $145-150 in the 1920s, designs with more exotic materials could cost as much as $2,000. Among the house's more elegant offerings was the robe de style, a design popularized by Jeanne Lanvin, which they continued to produce into the 1940s.

References

1899 establishments in France
1957 disestablishments in France
Clothing brands of France
High fashion brands